Surfeit locus protein 6 is a protein that in humans is encoded by the SURF6 gene.

This gene is located in the surfeit gene cluster, a group of very tightly linked genes that do not share sequence similarity. The gene demonstrates features of a housekeeping gene, being ubiquitously expressed, and the encoded protein has been localized to the nucleolus. The protein includes motifs found in both the mouse and fish orthologs, which suggests a putative function as a nucleolar-matrix protein with nucleic acid-binding properties, based on characteristics determined in mouse.

References

Further reading